"Love Yourz" is a song by American rapper J. Cole, released on February 27, 2016 as the fourth single from his third studio album, 2014 Forest Hills Drive. The song was produced by Illmind, Cardiak, and CritaCal and was written by J. Cole, Ramon Ibanga, Jr., Carl McCormick, and Calvin Price. The song was certified Platinum by the Recording Industry Association of America (RIAA), selling over 1,000,000 units in the United States.

Music video
On his 31st birthday, Cole released the live music video for "Love Yourz" on January 28, 2016, along with a surprise live album, Forest Hills Drive: Live. The music video was filmed during his Forest Hills Drive Tour, and was also featured in his HBO documentary, Forest Hills Drive: Homecoming on January 9, 2015.

Charts

Certifications

References

2016 singles
2014 songs
J. Cole songs
Songs written by J. Cole
Columbia Records singles
Songs written by Cardiak
Songs written by Illmind